Luke 23 is the twenty-third chapter of the Gospel of Luke in the New Testament of the Christian Bible. The book containing this chapter is anonymous, but early Christian tradition uniformly affirmed that Luke the Evangelist composed this Gospel as well as the Acts of the Apostles. This chapter records the trial of Jesus Christ before Pontius Pilate, Jesus' meeting with Herod Antipas, and his crucifixion, death and burial.

Text

The original text was written in Koine Greek. This chapter is divided into 56 verses.

Textual witnesses
Some early manuscripts containing the text of this chapter are:
Papyrus 75 (AD 175–225)
Codex Vaticanus (325-350)
Codex Sinaiticus (330-360)
Codex Bezae (c. 400)
Codex Washingtonianus (c. 400)
Codex Alexandrinus (400-440)
Codex Ephraemi Rescriptus (c. 450; extant verses 26–56)

Old Testament references
: Psalm 
: Psalm 
: Psalm a
: Psalm a; Psalm

New Testament references
: ; ; 
: ; ;
: ; ; 
: ; ;

Verse 1
And the whole multitude of them arose, and led him unto Pilate.
"The whole multitude of them" (hapan to plēthos) may also be translated as "the whole assembly", or "the whole Council". Luke uses το πληθος (rather than το ὄχλος, to ochlos) to signify a multitude in number. They led Jesus to Pontius Pilate, the provincial governor (prefect) of Judaea.

Verse 3

 Then Pilate asked him, “Are you the king of the Jews?”
 He answered, “You say so.” (NRSV)
Cross reference: Matthew 27:11; Mark 15:2; John 18:37

Verse 3 in Greek
Textus Receptus/Majority Text:
 ὁ δὲ Πιλάτος ἐπηρώτησεν αὐτόν, λέγων, Σὺ εἶ ὁ βασιλεὺς τῶν Ἰουδαίων;
 ὁ δὲ ἀποκριθεὶς αὐτῷ ἔφη, Σὺ λέγεις.
Transliteration:
 Ho de Pilatos epērōtēsen auton, legōn, "Su ei ho basileus tōn Ioudaiōn?":
 Ho de apokritheis autō ephē, "Su legeis."

Verse 3 in Latin
Biblia Sacra Vulgata:
 Pilatus autem interrogavit eum dicens tu es rex Iudaeorum
 at ille respondens ait tu dicis.

The style of response is the same as in Luke 22:70, where Jesus answers the Sanhedrin's question, "Are you the Son of God?"

Verse 5
But they were the more fierce, saying, “He stirs up the people, teaching throughout all Judea, beginning from Galilee to this place.”
Traditionally, "throughout all Judea" has been rendered as "throughout all Jewry". F. W. Farrar suggests that these words imply a "Judean ministry" which the synoptic gospels do not narrate, as the only journey of Jesus in Judea which is recorded is that from Jericho to Jerusalem. On the other hand, Judea has "sometimes been the name of the whole land, including apparently parts beyond the Jordan", see Josephus, Antiquities of the Jews, XII, 4.11, which term would therefore include the area of Perea east of the Jordan River. Matthew, Mark and John all refer to Jesus' stay in Perea, and Lucan scholars generally assume that the route Jesus followed from Galilee to Jerusalem passed through this region.

Verse 14
[Pilate] said to them, "You have brought this Man to me, as one who misleads the people. And indeed, having examined Him in your presence, I have found no fault in this Man concerning those things of which you accuse Him."
Luke's version of the trial scene "emphasizes Pilate's reluctance to act against Jesus".

Verse 22
Then he said to them the third time, "Why, what evil has He done? I have found no reason for death in Him. I will therefore chastise Him and let Him go."
This "third time" of declaring Jesus' innocence follows the previous declarations in verses 4 and 14-15.

Verse 24
 So Pilate gave sentence that it should be as they requested.
("and Pilate ...") in critical texts such as Westcott-Hort. Pilate's "official decision"  was to comply with the request of the crowd. The word ἐπέκρινεν (epekrinen, "pronounced sentence") is specific to Luke, although it also appears in the apocryphal , where innocent men are condemned to death.

Verse 29

Blessed are the barren, and the wombs that never bore and the breasts which never gave suck.
The prophet Hosea spoke in similar language, when recognising that the disobedience of the Israelites required God's punishment, but calling for some mitigation:
Give them, O Lord —
what will you give?
Give them a miscarrying womb
and dry breasts.

Verses 39-43
One of the two thieves who die with Jesus reviles him, the other is saved by faith.

Verse 44
Now it was about the sixth hour, and there was darkness over all the earth until the ninth hour.
Like , Luke records three hours of darkness, which signify "the awesomeness of what is taking place".

Verse 46
And when Jesus had cried out with a loud voice, He said, “Father, ‘into Your hands I commit My spirit.’ ” Having said this, He breathed His last.

Verse 48
And the whole crowd who came together to that sight, seeing what had been done, beat their breasts and returned.
William Robertson Nicoll understands the phrase "the things that had happened" (tà genómena) "comprehensively, including the crucifixion and all its accompaniments". Albert Barnes refers to "the earthquake, the darkness, and the sufferings of Jesus" as the "things which were done". The earthquake is only recorded in Matthew's Gospel, but the third century historian Sextus Julius Africanus also refers to an earthquake on or around the day of the crucifixion.

Verse 49
And all his acquaintance, and the women that followed him from Galilee, stood afar off, beholding these things. 
"The women" that followed Jesus from Galilee (also in Luke 53:55) were "Mary Magdalene, Joanna, Mary the mother of James, and the other women with them" according to Luke 24:10. Matthew 27:55 lists "Mary Magdalene, Mary the mother of James and Joseph, and the mother of the sons of Zebedee", whereas Mark 15:40 names "Mary Magdalene, Mary the mother of James the little and Joses, and Salome".

Verse 55
And the women who had come with Him from Galilee followed after, and they observed the tomb and how His body was laid.
According to Luke 24:10, "the women"  (also in Luke 23:49) were "Mary Magdalene, Joanna, Mary the mother of James, and the other women with them". Matthew 27:61 lists "Mary Magdalene, and the other Mary", whereas Mark 15:47 names "Mary Magdalene, and Mary the mother of Joses".

See also 
 Burial of Jesus
 Crucifixion of Jesus
 Holy Week
 Jerusalem
 Ministry of Jesus
 Pontius Pilate
 Stephaton
 Related Bible parts: Psalm 22, Psalm 69, Jeremiah 15, Matthew 27, Mark 15, Luke 24, John 18, John 19

References

Bibliography

External links 
 King James Bible - Wikisource
English Translation with Parallel Latin Vulgate
Online Bible at GospelHall.org (ESV, KJV, Darby, American Standard Version, Bible in Basic English)
Multiple bible versions at Bible Gateway (NKJV, NIV, NRSV etc.)

Gospel of Luke chapters
Pontius Pilate
Descent from the Cross
Burial of Jesus